Postal codes in the British Virgin Islands are used by the British Virgin Islands postal service, BVI Post, to route mail in the island

Postal codes are composed of a country code, "VG", and four digits.

There are six postal codes in use:

References

Communications in the British Virgin Islands
British Virgin Islands